Fort Terrett was a U.S. Army post from 1852 to 1854, later the site of a ranch, an historic locale in Sutton County, Texas, United States.

Originally named "Post on the Rio Llano", "Post on the North Fork River Llano", or "Camp Lugubre", it was renamed in 1852 after Lt John Terrett. Terrett was killed in the Battle of Monterrey in 1846. Lt. Col. Henry Bainbridge established the camp in February 1852 for protection for the settlements and travelers along the Upper San Antonio Road.  It was located along the North Llano River in Sutton County.  The post was abandoned in February 1854 the troops locating farther to the west and north on the advancing frontier.  The fort buildings were then used for the Terrett Ranch.  The state of Texas constructed a site marker now located off CR 307 near I-10 Exit 429.

References

Sutton County, Texas
Ghost towns in West Texas
Locale (geographic)